The 2005–06 St. Lawrence Saints women's hockey team represented St. Lawrence University in the 2005–06 NCAA Division I women's hockey season. The Saints were coached by Paul Flanagan and play their home games at Appleton Arena. The Saints were a member of the Eastern College Athletic Conference and were unable to win the NCAA Women's Ice Hockey Championship.

Regular season

Schedule

Player stats

Awards and honors
Sabrina Harbec, First Team All-America selection (2006)
Annie Guay, Second Team All-America selection (2006)
In 2006, Harbec was a top three finalist for the Patty Kazmaier Memorial Award. She was the first St. Lawrence player to be a finalist for the award.

NCAA Frozen Four

See also
St. Lawrence Saints women's ice hockey

References

Saint Lawrence
NCAA women's ice hockey Frozen Four seasons
St. Lawrence Saints women's ice hockey seasons